The Internal Displacement Monitoring Centre or IDMC is an International non-governmental organization established in 1998 by the Norwegian Refugee Council in Geneva. 

It is focused on monitoring and providing information and analysis on the world's internally displaced persons (IDPs).

Work
The IDMC contributes to improving national and international capacities to protect the assist of the millions of people around the globe who have been displaced within their own country. IDMC also develops statistics and analysis on internal displacement, including analysis commissioned for use by the United Nations.

Funding
IDMC is funded by US Agency for International Development, Norwegian Ministry of Foreign Affairs, Swedish International Development Cooperation Agency, Australian Department of Foreign Affairs, Liechtenstein Ministry of Foreign Affairs, the European Commission, the International Organization for Migration, the UK Department for International Development, the German Federal Foreign Office, UNISDR, UNHCR and Charities Aid Foundation.

References

External links 
Official website (English version)

International nongovernmental organizations
Organizations established in 1998
Internally displaced persons
1998 establishments in Switzerland